Scuticociliatia is a subclass of ciliates in the class Oligohymenophorea. Its members are called scuticociliates. These unicellular eukaryotes are marine microorganisms that are usually free-living and widely distributed in the world's oceans. Around 20 members of the group have been identified as causative agents of the disease scuticociliatosis, in which the ciliates are parasites of other marine organisms. Species known to be susceptible include a broad range of teleosts, seahorses, sharks, and some crustaceans.

References

External links 
 

Oligohymenophorea